The Basilica of St Paul is a Roman Catholic Parish church located in Rabat, Malta.

History
The church is built on part of the site of the Roman city Melite, which included all of Mdina and a large part of present-day Rabat. There were numerous churches built on the site of the present church which dates from the 17th century. In 1336 bishop Hilarius refers to the church as ecclesia Sancti Pauli de crypta, and also mentions the cemetery and the Roman ditch. The present church was built to replace a church which was completed in 1578. The new church was built with funds provided by the noble woman Guzmana Navarra on plans prepared by Francesco Buonamici. The church building commenced in 1653 was completed by Lorenzo Gafà in 1683. Annexed with the church of St Paul is a smaller church dedicated to St Publius which was rebuilt in 1692 and again in 1726 by Salvu Borg. The church was elevated to a Minor Basilica in 2020.

The Grotto
Entrance to the grotto is through the church of St Publius. The grotto is the place where according to tradition St Paul lived and preached during his three months stay in Malta in 60 A.D. In 1748 Grand Master Pinto donated a statue of St Paul for the grotto. The grotto was visited by various Popes, Pope John Paul II in 1990 and 2001 and Pope Benedict XVI in 2010. It was visited the third time by Pope Francis during his apostolic journey to the Maltese islands on the 2nd of April 2022. 

The grotto is linked to the Wignacourt Museum.

The church is listed on the National Inventory of the Cultural Property of the Maltese Islands.

References

Rabat, Malta
Collegiate churches
Collegiate churches in Malta
18th-century Roman Catholic church buildings in Malta
National Inventory of the Cultural Property of the Maltese Islands
Baroque church buildings in Malta
Limestone churches in Malta
Paul
Roman Catholic churches completed in 1783